The Waterside Bridge is a planned pedestrian and cycle bridge over the River Trent in Nottingham, England. When built, it will be the first new river bridge in Nottingham since the Clifton Bridge was built sixty years ago.

Location

The site has been chosen to connect to cycling infrastructure on both sides of the river. On the north bank, the bridge will connect with the riverside cycleway to Colwick Country Park, and also allow access to Nottingham City's Eastern Cycle Corridor. To the south, the riverside path carries National Cycle Route 15, and gives traffic-free access to the Holme Pierrepont National Watersports Centre; The Hook local nature reserve; Nottingham Forest's City Ground; and the West Bridgford Embankment.

Current status
Funding has been secured and a contractor appointed to undertake detailed design and construction.
A planning application is expected in 2023, construction to start in 2024, and the bridge to open in 2025.

See also
List of crossings of the River Trent

References

External links
 Rushcliffe Borough Council

Bridges in Nottingham
Bridges across the River Trent
West Bridgford